Dhaka Collegiate School is a secondary school in Dhaka, Bangladesh. It is one of the oldest schools in Bangladesh. The students of collegiate school are called Collegiatian.

History

The school was established in Dhaka on 21 June 1835 as  Dhaka English seminary. It was the first government high school established by the British under the East India Company in the Bengal province for teaching English literature and science. This was later named as Dhaka Collegiate School.  Mr. Redge, an English missionary, acted as the first head master of the school. In its first batch it had Nawab of Dhaka Khwaja Abdul Ghani as a student.

The foundation of Dhaka Intermediate College later to be known as Dhaka College was laid down in 1841. The school separated from the college in 1908. Since then it has been the Zilla School of Dhaka, although it continues to be called Dhaka Collegiate School.

This institution has delivered many famous alumni in its history.

Location
The school is located in Sadarghat crossing, west of Bahadur Shah Park and south of Jagannath University, on the banks of the Buriganga River.

Courses
The school offers courses in science, humanities and commerce and classes conducted in two shifts (morning and day).

Headmasters and headmistresses 

 Mr. Ridge (1835–1839)
 Mr. Sinclaire (1839–1841)
 Mr. Pratt (1841)
 Mr. Carsil (1848)
 Mr. E. U. Good (1863–1865)
 Mr. Babu U. C Datta
 Mr. Goon
 Mr. W. B. Livingstone
 Mr. Leigh Fever (1872)
 Mr. Babu K. C. Ghosh (1873–1884)
 Mr. Babu I. C. Bose 
 Mr. Rai Sahib R. M. Gupta (1888–1896)
 Mr. Babu B. M. Sen (1897-1902)
 Mr. Babu R. K. Das (1903–1910)
 Mr. Babu B. K. Bose (1910–1914)
 Mr. Babu Abhaya Charan Das (1914–1919)
 Mr. Khan Bahadur Tassaduq Ahmad (1919–1927)
 Mr. Khan Bahadur Badiur Rahman (1927–1932)
 Mr. Rai Saheb J. M. Datta (1932–1935)
 Mr. Babu J. C. Datta (1935–1943)
 Mr. Babu B. K. Bhattacharya (1943–1944)
 Mr. M. O. Goni (1944–1945)
 Dr. Enamul Haque (1945–1948)
 Dr. Enamul Haque (1948–1950)
 Mr. S. M. Sadaruddin (1950–1951)
 Mr. A. A. Mahmud (1951–1952)
 Mr. Abid Ali (1952–1954)
 Mr. M. S. A. R. B. Kader (1954–1956)
 Mr. Sahabuddin (1956)
 Mr. M. A. K. Bhuiyan (1956–1958)
 Mr. Qazi Ambor Ali (1958–1959)
 Mr. Sufi Hussein Ali (1959)
 Mr. T. Hossain (1961–1965)
 Mr. M. A. K. Bhuiyan (1966–1967)
 Mr. Hafizuddin Ahmed (1967–1970)
 Mr. Md. Abdur Razzaq (1970)
 Mr. A. A. Khalilur Rahman (1972–1975)
 Mr. M. A. Motaleb (1975–1976)
 Mr. Md. Mizanur Rahman Bhuiyan (1976–1978) 
 Mr. Shamsul Alam Chowdhuri (1978–1987)
 Mr. Mostafizur Rahman (1987–1990)
 Mr. Md. Sekandar Ali Khalifa (1990–1992)
 Mrs. Monzil Ara Ahmed (1992–1996)
 Mr. Md. Motiur Rahman (1996–1999) 
 Mrs. Syeda Zinnatun Noor (2000–2001)
 Mr. Md. Anwar Hossain (2001–2007)
 Mr. Abdul Malek Mia (2007)
 Mr. Ali Akkas Ahmed (Acting)(2007–2008)
 Mrs. Rowshon Ara (Acting)(2008–2010)
 MD. Farid Uddin (2010–2012)
 A.K.M. Mostafa Kamal(2012–2013)
 MD. Khalekh (2013–2014)
 MD. Abu Sayed Bhuiya (2014–2019)
 MD.Ariful Islam (2019–Present)

Notable alumni 

 Bir Shreshtho Matiur Rahman, Muktijoddha (freedom fighter)
 Jagdish Chandra Bose, physicist and inventor
 Buddhadeb Bosu, poet of Bengali literature
 Khorshed Alam, former governor of Bangladesh Bank
 Salahuddin Ahmed, former Governor of Bangladesh Bank
 Megh Nad Saha, physicist
 Raisul Islam Asad, Muktijoddha (freedom fighter) and national award-winning actor
 Kabir Chowdhury, former president of Bangla Academy
 Munier Chowdhury, linguist, martyred intellectual
 A.M. Harun-ar-Rashid, physicist
 Khwaja Abdul Ghani, Nawab of Dhaka
 Moulvi Abdul Ali, zamindar based in Dhaka
 Mustafa Kamal, Chairman of the Law Commission, former Chief Justice of Bangladesh
 Khan Ataur Rahman, film director
 Alamgir Kabir, film director
 Nicholas Pogose, founder of Pogose School
 Pranab Mukherjee, former President of India
 Tabarak Husain, diplomat
 Syed Shamsul Haque, writer of Bengali literature
 Ainun Nishat, water resource and climate change specialist, serving as a professor emeritus of BRAC University
 Dinesh Gupta,Famous Indian Revolutionary,who took part in famous Writers' Building attack.

In contemporary literature 
 In Satyajit Ray's Popular Detective Series Feluda, Mentions Pradosh Chandra Mitter aka Feluda's Father late Jaykrishna Mitter was a mathematics teacher of Dhaka Collegiate School.

References

External links
 Dhaka Collegiate School  at Facebook
Dhaka Collegiate School-Officials at Facebook

Old Dhaka
Schools in Dhaka District
1835 establishments in India
Educational institutions established in 1835
Dhaka Collegiate School